Odéon is a station on Line 4 and Line 10 of the Paris Métro. It is located in the 6th arrondissement, on the Rive Gauche. In 2013, the station was used by 6,156,948 passengers, making it the 58th busiest out of 302.

History
The station was opened on 9 January 1910 as part of the connecting section of Line 4 under the Seine between Châtelet and Raspail. The Line 10 platforms opened on 14 February 1926 as part of the line's extension from Mabillon. It was the eastern terminus of the line until its extension to Place d'Italie (now on Line 7) on 15 February 1930. Named after the nearby Odéon theatre, the station is located under the Carrefour de l'Odéon, in the 6th arrondissement of Paris.

The Luxembourg Palace is nearby, also served by the Gare du Luxembourg on RER B.

Station layout

Gallery

References

Roland, Gérard (2003). Stations de métro. D’Abbesses à Wagram. Éditions Bonneton.

Paris Métro stations in the 6th arrondissement of Paris
Railway stations in France opened in 1910